Nacerdes is a genus of false blister beetles in the family Oedemeridae. There are about 40 described species in Nacerdes.

Species
These 15 species belong to the genus Nacerdes:

 Nacerdes akiyamai Svihla, 1998
 Nacerdes apicalis (Kono, 1932)
 Nacerdes apicipennis Svihla, 1998
 Nacerdes arcuata Tian, Ren & Li, 2014
 Nacerdes baibarana (Kono, 1932)
 Nacerdes carniolica (Gistl, 1834)
 Nacerdes gracilis (W.L.E.Schmidt, 1846)
 Nacerdes hesperica (Magistretti, 1941)
 Nacerdes hiromichii Svihla, 2004
 Nacerdes kantneri Svihla, 2001
 Nacerdes konoi
 Nacerdes melanura (Linnaeus, 1758) (wharf borer)
 Nacerdes raymondi (Mulsant & Godart, 1860)
 Nacerdes taiwana (Kono, 1932)
 Nacerdes transfertalis Svihla, 1998

References

Further reading

External links

 

Oedemeridae
Articles created by Qbugbot